Kuang Lubin (born 26 January 1956) is a Chinese former international basketball player who competed in the 1984 Summer Olympics.

References 

1956 births
Living people
Asian Games medalists in basketball
Basketball players at the 1978 Asian Games
Basketball players at the 1982 Asian Games
Basketball players at the 1984 Summer Olympics
Chinese men's basketball players
1978 FIBA World Championship players
1982 FIBA World Championship players
Olympic basketball players of China
Asian Games gold medalists for China
Asian Games silver medalists for China
Medalists at the 1978 Asian Games
Medalists at the 1982 Asian Games